Nehle Peh Dehlaa is a 1976 Indian Hindi-language film directed by Raj Khosla and produced by Sunil Dutt who started in the film. The music is by R. D. Burman.

Plot

Two brothers, Ram (Sunil Dutt) and Rahim (Vinod Khanna), are separated at a young age by a smuggler (Prem Nath) who kills their father, who is a police officer. Both of them grow up to become thieves. They become partners, yet remain unaware of their brotherhood. The movie ends with them discovering their past and taking revenge on the smuggler.

Cast
Sunil Dutt as Sunil / Ram
Saira Banu as Beena
Vinod Khanna as Rahim
Bindu as Filomina
Premnath as General
Ranjeet as Alberto
Trilok Kapoor as Police Commissioner
Dev Kumar as Tiger
Anwar Hussain as Doctor
Ramayan Tiwari as Karim
Om Prakash as Mangal
Bharat Bhushan as Police Inspector
Kamini Kaushal as Sunil's Mother

Soundtrack

The music was composed by R. D. Burman and released on Saregama.

References

External links
 

1976 films
1970s Hindi-language films
Films directed by Raj Khosla
Films scored by R. D. Burman